The EAC Generals basketball program represents Emilio Aguinaldo College (EAC) in men's basketball as a member of the National Collegiate Athletic Association (Philippines) (NCAA). The EAC Generals joined the NCAA in 2009, having been a fixture in the National Capital Region Athletic Association (NCRAA) and Universities and Colleges Athletic Association (UCAA).

History

NCRAA and UCAA champions 
The Generals have been champions in the  NCRAA and UCAA due to the exploits of Ronjay Buenafe, seen to be as the best player in program history, having his #8 jersey retired by the team.

Entry to the NCAA 
The Generals joined the NCAA in 2009 as one of the three guest teams. The Generals finished with a 6–12 record.  Nomar Angeles Isla coached the Generals until 2010 when he went on to be their representative in the Management Committee. He was replaced by Gerry Esplana. They had their best showing in 2013 when they finished with a winning record at 10–8, but barely missed the Final Four. At the next season, the Generals finished outside the playoff places, and figured in a brawl against the Mapua Cardinals. This, coupled with internal issues with management, led to Esplana to resign. Andy de Guzman coached the team in 2016 to a last-place finish. EAC-IAC Brigadiers (their juniors team) coach Ariel Sison then replaced de Guzman. In the 2017 season, the Generals, led by Sidney Onwubere, finished with a 7–11 record. After finishing with a 4–14 record in 2018, Sison was replaced by Oliver Bunyi. The Generals equaled their previous season record, but had notable wins against playoff teams Lyceum and San Sebastian.

Current roster
NCAA Season 98

Head coaches 

 1998–2010: Nomar Angeles Isla
 2011–2014: Gerry Esplana
 2015: Andy de Guzman
 2016–2018: Ariel Sison
 2019–present: Oliver Bunyi

Season-by-season records

References 

National Collegiate Athletic Association (Philippines) basketball teams